The 2022 World Figure Skating Championships were held in Montpellier, France from March 21–27, 2022. Figure skaters competed for the title of world champion in men's singles, women's singles, pairs, and ice dance. The competition was used to determine the entry quotas for each federation at the 2023 World Championships. 

Montpellier was announced as the host in June 2019. It is the first time that Montpellier has ever hosted the World Championships and the first time that France has hosted since 2012.

Background 
The tournament was notable for several high-profile absences. On March 1, 2022, the ISU banned figure skaters and officials from Russia and Belarus from attending all international competitions due to the 2022 Russian invasion of Ukraine. World champions in three of the four disciplines (as well as several other medalists) were barred from competing as a result. The Chinese Skating Association opted not to send any skaters to the competition. Several leading competitors such as Nathan Chen and Yuzuru Hanyu withdrew from the World Championship due to injury.

Controversy 
During the men's short program on March 24, one judge received backlash from fans and the media for voting that Ukrainian skater Ivan Shmuratko had committed a "costume/prop violation" for wearing the Ukrainian national team's training clothes rather than his costume. Shmuratko did not receive a deduction due to a majority of judges' votes being required, and the crowd gave him a standing ovation for his performance. Shmuratko qualified for the free skating, where he finished at the last position.

On the same day, one day prior to the rhythm dance, the ISU rejected Ukrainian ice dancers Oleksandra Nazarova / Maksym Nikitin's proposed program set to music by Ukrainian artists that included a 15-second snippet of a speech by Ukrainian president Volodymyr Zelenskyy in the Ukrainian language calling for peace; the ISU cited the speech portion of the program as "propaganda". Following intervention by their federation, Nazarova/Nikitin were allowed to compete using a version featuring only music, and like teammate Shmuratko, they also wore the colors of the Ukrainian national team rather than their costumes and received a standing ovation. Despite limited training time leading up to the event, they said that they wanted to perform the new program set to "1944" by Jamala and Ukrainian folk song "Oi u luzi chervona kalyna" performed by Andriy Khlyvnyuk of BoomBox to "express what they are living through." After the rhythm dance, Ukrainian Figure Skating Federation president Mikhail Makarov issued an appeal to ISU president Jan Dijkema and National Olympic Committee of Ukraine president Sergey Bubka asking for help in understanding the rationale behind the ISU's decision. Nazarova/Nikitin later withdrew from the free dance due to feeling that performing their upbeat Moulin Rouge! program was inappropriate in light of the ongoing conflict in Ukraine.

Qualification

Age and minimum TES requirements 
Skaters were eligible for the 2022 World Championships if they turned 15 years of age before July 1, 2021, and if they met the minimum technical elements score requirements. The ISU accepted scores if they were obtained at senior-level ISU-recognized international competitions during the ongoing season at least 21 days before the first official practice day of the championships or during the two preceding seasons (adjusted from the traditional one due to the pandemic).

Number of entries per discipline 
Based on the results of the 2021 World Championships, each ISU member nation can field one to three entries per discipline.

Schedule

Entries 
Member nations began announcing their selections in December 2021. The International Skating Union published a complete list of entries on March 2, 2022.

Changes to preliminary entries

Medal summary

Medalists
Medals awarded to the skaters who achieve the highest overall placements in each discipline:

Small medals awarded to the skaters who achieve the highest short program or rhythm dance placements in each discipline:

Medals awarded to the skaters who achieve the highest free skating or free dance placements in each discipline:

Medals by country 
Table of medals for overall placement:

Table of small medals for placement in the short/rhythm segment:

Table of small medals for placement in the free segment:

Records 

The following new ISU best scores were set during this competition:

Results

Men 
With Shoma Uno earning gold and Yuma Kagiyama taking silver, Japan placed at least one man on the podium for an eighth consecutive World Championships. Uno's title is the country's first in men's singles since 2017.

Women 
The ban against Russian and Belarusian skaters seriously affected the women's singles competition as Russian skaters won 5 of the 6 last World titles in the discipline. They also won 5 of the 6 World medals awarded during the last two World Championships, including a podium sweep in 2021.

Kaori Sakamoto of Japan won the country's first medal since 2018 and the first title since Mao Asada in 2014. Silver medalist Loena Hendrickx of Belgium won the country's first ISU Championships medal in women's singles, while bronze medalist Alysa Liu of the United States won the country's first medal since Ashley Wagner in 2016. It was the first podium featuring skaters representing three different countries since 2014.

Pairs 
Due to the ban against Russian skaters and the Chinese Skating Association's decision not to send any skaters to compete, none of top five pairs from the 2022 Winter Olympics participated at this event. The final number of participants (14 pairs) was the lowest since 1989.

Alexa Knierim / Brandon Frazier of the United States won the country's first pairs medal since Kyoko Ina / John Zimmerman earned bronze in 2002; it was also the first World title for the country since Tai Babilonia / Randy Gardner won in 1979. Japan's Riku Miura / Ryuichi Kihara earned the highest-ever placement for a Japanese pair with their silver medal finish. Americans Ashley Cain-Gribble / Timothy LeDuc, who were in second place after the short program, withdrew after a fall by Cain-Gribble during their free skate which necessitated her to be stretchered from the ice and hospitalized.

Ice dance

Notes

References

External links 
 World Championships at the International Skating Union
 
 Results

World Figure Skating Championships
2022 World Figure Skating Championships
World Figure Skating Championships
2022 in French sport
March 2022 sports events in France
Sport in Montpellier